Shinee World III (promoted as SHINee CONCERT "SHINee WORLD III") is the third concert tour by South Korean boy group, Shinee. The tour kicked off with a two-day special concert in Seoul, on March 8 and 9, 2014. It continued to six other countries—Taiwan, China, Indonesia, Mexico, Chile, Argentina—with Shinee performing in a total of seven cities. Their first ever world tour, it gathered over 67,000 fans over its short eight-date, four-month run, making it one of the most successful concert events of the year.

The live album of the tour, The 3rd Concert Album "Shinee World III", was released on December 11, 2014. The album contains two CDs with a total of 33 tracks. The album was recorded in their Seoul leg at Olympic Gymnastics Arena on March 8 and 9, 2014. On April 27, 2015, they released the concert video album entitled Shinee - The 3rd Concert "Shinee World III".

Background

On January 29, 2014, SM Entertainment announced Shinee's tour would begin at the Olympic Gymnastics Arena in Songpagu, Seoul on March 8 and 9. It was their first concert in South Korea in almost two years. Tickets sold out in less than 15 minutes, and the group performed in front of approximately 20,000 fans. They performed a total of 29 songs, including some of their hits like "Juliette", "Lucifer", "Ring Ding Dong", "Sherlock (Clue + Note)", and the Korean versions of Japanese singles, such as "3 2 1" and others.

The tour then continued to Mexico, Chile, and Argentina. Shinee performed at the Mexico City Arena on April 4 for 8,000 fans, their first concert in Latin America. On April 6 and April 8, they performed in Chile and Argentina, respectively. In Chile, the concert was sold out within minutes and gathered around 8,500 fans. The group performed 25 songs. To celebrate member Jonghyun's birthday, the fans prepared signs that read, "Happy Birthday Kim Jong-hyun". The concert also gathered over 100 reporters from different press media. In Argentina, the concert gathered over 8,500 fans and was sold out immediately. Like the fans in Santiago, the fans in Buenos Aires also prepared a special event to celebrate Jonghyun's birthday. The fans prepared a cake and signs that read, "Happy Birthday Jonghyun!". Another surprise for the group was the special event during "Green Rain" when the fans held up signs that read, "Argentina loves Shinee!". Shinee  thanked fans for their support.

On June 1, the group held a concert for the first time since their debut in Shanghai and, despite the bad weather, gathered around 10,000 fans. Onew was unable to participate in the Jakarta concert as he was recovering from vocal cord surgery.

Set list

Schedule

References

Shinee concert tours
2014 concert tours